The Dodger Point Fire Lookout was built in 1933 in Olympic National Park as a fire observation station. Large windows on all four sides are covered by awning-style wood shutters. It was built by the U.S. Forest Service in what was at the time Olympic National Forest, possibly with assistance from the Civilian Conservation Corps. During World War II, the lookout was used as an Aircraft Warning Service station. Dodger Point and Pyramid Peak Lookout are the only such stations remaining in Olympic National Park out of thirteen constructed.

The Dodger Point Lookout was placed on the National Register of Historic Places on July 13, 2007.

References

Government buildings completed in 1933
Towers completed in 1933
National Register of Historic Places in Olympic National Park
Buildings and structures in Jefferson County, Washington
Fire lookout towers on the National Register of Historic Places in Washington (state)
Civilian Conservation Corps in Washington (state)
Aircraft Warning Service
Military facilities on the National Register of Historic Places in Washington (state)
National Register of Historic Places in Jefferson County, Washington
1933 establishments in Washington (state)